The great crested grebe (Podiceps cristatus) is a member of the grebe family of water birds noted for its elaborate mating display.

Taxonomy
The great crested grebe was formally described by the Swedish naturalist Carl Linnaeus in 1758 in the tenth edition of his Systema Naturae under the binomial name Colymbus cristatus. The great crested grebe is now the type species of the genus Podiceps that was erected by the English naturalist John Latham in 1787. The type locality is Sweden.

Three subspecies are recognised:
 P. c. cristatus (Linnaeus, 1758) – Eurasia
 P. c. infuscatus Salvadori, 1884 – Africa
 P. c. australis Gould, 1844 – Australia, Tasmania, South Island of New Zealand

Description 

The great crested grebe is the largest member of the grebe family found in the Old World, with some larger species residing in the Americas. It is an excellent swimmer and diver, and pursues its fish prey underwater. The adults are unmistakable in summer with head and neck decorations. In winter, this is whiter than most grebes, with white above the eye, and a pink bill.

The young are distinctive because their heads are striped black and white. They lose these markings when they become adults.

Distribution 

The great crested grebe breeds in vegetated areas of freshwater lakes. The subspecies P. c. cristatus is found across Europe and east across the Palearctic. It is resident in the milder west of its range, but migrates from the colder regions. It winters on freshwater lakes and reservoirs or the coast. The African subspecies P. c. infuscatus and the Australasian subspecies P. c. australis are mainly sedentary.

Behaviour

Breeding
The great crested grebe has an elaborate mating display. Like all grebes, it nests on the water's edge. The nest is built by both sexes. The clutch averages four chalky white eggs which average  in size and weigh . Incubation is by both parents and begins as soon as the first egg is laid. The eggs hatch asynchronously after 27 to 29 days. The precocial young are cared for and fed by both parents.

Young grebes are capable of swimming and diving almost at hatching. The adults teach these skills to their young by carrying them on their back and diving, leaving the chicks to float on the surface; they then re-emerge a few feet away so that the chicks may swim back onto them.

Feeding
The great crested grebe feeds mainly on fish, but also small crustaceans, insects, small frogs and newts.

Relationship to humans

This species was hunted almost to extinction in the United Kingdom in the 19th century for its head plumes, which were used to decorate ladies' hats and garments. The Royal Society for the Protection of Birds was set up to help protect this species, which is again a common sight.

The great crested grebe and its behaviour was the subject of one of the landmark publications in avian ethology: Julian Huxley's 1914 paper on The Courtship‐habits of the Great Crested Grebe (Podiceps cristatus).

Gallery

References

Sources

External links 

 Ageing and sexing (PDF) by Javier Blasco-Zumeta & Gerd-Michael Heinze
 
 Great Crested Grebe Species text in The Atlas of Southern African Birds
 
 
 BTO BirdFacts – Great-crested Grebe
 
 
 

great crested grebe
Birds of Africa
Birds of Eurasia
Birds of Oceania
great crested grebe
Birds of Nepal
great crested grebe